Finland was represented by Kirka, with the song "Hengaillaan", at the 1984 Eurovision Song Contest, which took place on 5 May in Luxembourg City. "Hengaillaan" was chosen as the Finnish entry at the national final organised by broadcaster Yle and held on 18 February, when Kirka won the Finnish Eurovision ticket at his eighth attempt.

Before Eurovision

National final 
The final was held at the Yle studios in Helsinki, hosted by Maria Valkama. Eleven songs took part, having been chosen by an expert jury from 21 songs which had been broadcast on radio only on 22 and 23 January 1984. The winner was chosen by postcard voting.

Other participants included future Finnish representatives Sonja Lumme (1985) and Anneli Saaristo (1989).

At Eurovision 
On the night of the final Kirka performed 16th in the running order, following Turkey and preceding Switzerland. At the close of voting "Hengaillaan" had received 46 points, placing Finland 9th of the 19 entries, the country's highest finish since 1975. The Finnish jury awarded its 12 points to Italy.

Voting

References

External links
 Full national final on Yle Elävä Arkisto

1984
Countries in the Eurovision Song Contest 1984
Eurovision